Chaiwut Wattana (born July 14, 1981), simply known as Wut, is a Thai retired professional footballer who played as a defensive midfielder.

International career

In May, 2008 he played a friendly match against Nepal. Chaiwut has currently played 5 times for the full Thailand national team.

International

References

External links

1981 births
Living people
Chaiwut Wattana
Chaiwut Wattana
Association football midfielders
Chaiwut Wattana
Chaiwut Wattana
Chaiwut Wattana
Chaiwut Wattana
Chaiwut Wattana
Chaiwut Wattana
Chaiwut Wattana
Chaiwut Wattana
Chaiwut Wattana
Chaiwut Wattana